The Malomir mine is one of the largest gold mines in Russia and in the world. The mine is located in Amur Oblast, 35 km north of the nearest town of Stoyba. The mine has estimated reserves of 13.77 million oz of gold.

References 

Gold mines in Russia
Buildings and structures in Amur Oblast